Setomedea is a genus of small air-breathing land snails, terrestrial pulmonate gastropod mollusks in the family Charopidae.

Species
The genus Setomedea includes four species.
 Setomedea janae
 Setomedea monteithi
 Setomedea nudicostata
 Setomedea seticostata

References

 
Charopidae
Taxonomy articles created by Polbot